The Ervin Lewis House is a historic mansion in Byram, Mississippi, U.S.. It was built for John Coon prior to the American Civil War As Coon came from the North, the Union Army did not destroy it during the war. It was purchased by Ervin Lewis, who was from South Carolina, after the war. It was designed in the Greek Revival architectural style. It has been listed on the National Register of Historic Places since December 1, 1989.

References

Houses on the National Register of Historic Places in Mississippi
Greek Revival architecture in Mississippi
Houses completed in 1860
Houses in Hinds County, Mississippi